Anevrina is a genus of phorid flies circumscribed by the Italian naturalist Paolo Lioy in 1864.

Species
A 2010 paper by the entomologists Paul T. Smith and Brian V. Brown recognized the following extant species:

A. capillata Michailovskaya, 1999
A. curvinervis (Becker, 1901)
A. glabrata Liu & Zhu, 2006
A. kozaneki Brown, 1995
A. luggeri (Aldrich, 1892)
A. macateei (Malloch, 1913)
A. olympiae (Aldrich, 1904)
A. neotropica Smith & Brown, 2010
A. sphaeropyge Beyer, 1958
A. thoracica (Meigen, 1830)
A. unispinosa (Zetterstedt, 1860)
A. urbana (Meigen, 1830)
A. variabilis (Brues, 1908)
A. wyatti Disney, 2006

, Fossilworks recognizes the following fossil species:
A. huberti Prokop & Nel, 2005
A. oligocaenica (Brues, 1939)
A. shoumayae  Brown, 2013

References

Further reading

 

Phoridae
Platypezoidea genera
Taxa named by Paolo Lioy